John Maxwell (Max) Ballantyne  (4 August 1944 – 30 August 1989) was an Australian rules footballer who played with Collingwood in the Victorian Football League (VFL).

Notes

External links 

1944 births
Australian rules footballers from Victoria (Australia)
Collingwood Football Club players
1989 deaths